Erkrath is a town in the district of Mettmann, in North Rhine-Westphalia, Germany.

Geography
Erkrath is situated on the river Düssel, directly east of Düsseldorf and west of Wuppertal, close to the famous Neandertal. It has two stations, Erkrath station, which is served by Rhine-Ruhr S-Bahn line S 8, and Erkrath Nord station, which is served by S-Bahn line S 28, both at 20-minute intervals.

History
In that part of Neandertal, which is located in Erkrath, in the summer of 1856, quarry workers discovered the fossilised remains of what became known as the Neanderthal man or Homo Neanderthalensis in Feldhof cave. The name Erkrath was first mentioned in 1148. Erkrath received town rights in 1966. In 1975, the municipality of Hochdahl was incorporated into Erkrath. As well its former borough Unterbach was incorporated into Düsseldorf. Only a part of Unterbach called Unterfeldhaus remained as now a borough of its own with Erkrath. Erkrath today has three local parts: Erkrath, Hochdahl and Unterfeldhaus.

Mayors

 Johann Kaiser (1898–1907) (the old town hall was built in 1899)
 Franz Zahren (1907–1930)
 Werner Hallauer (1930–1935)
 Heinrich Rasche (1935–1945), NSDAP, later FDP 
 Wilhelm Broch (1945–1946) 
 August Westerholz (1946), SPD
 Hermann Moritz (1946–1949), CDU
 Alex Bendt (1949–1954), SPD 
 Gertrud Thomé (later: Küpper) (1954–1956), CDU 
 Alex Bendt (1956–1961), SPD 
 Gertrud Küpper (geb. Thomé) (1961–1963), CDU 
 Johannes van Oost (1963–1964), 
 Gertrud Küpper (geb. Thomé) (1964–1972), CDU 
 Hans Weyer (1972–1974), SPD 
 Aloys Kiefer (1975–1983), CDU 
 Gloria Ziller (1983–1989), CDU 
 Rudolf Unger (1989–1999), SPD 
 Arno Werner (1999–2015), CDU 
 Christoph Schultz (since 2015), CDU

Gallery

Twin towns – sister cities

Erkrath is twinned with:
 West Lancashire, England, United Kingdom

Notable people

 Klaus Allofs (born 1956), German footballer, manager of VfL Wolfsburg, lived for a long time in Erkrath-Unterfeldhaus
 Thomas Allofs (born 1959), German footballer, lives in Erkrath-Unterfeldhaus and runs a disposal company in Düsseldorf
 Heiner Baltes (born 1949), German footballer
 Johann Heinrich Bongard (1779–1857), eye and wound surgeon and royal Prussian Hofrat, first author of a publication on the Neandertal
 Klaus Hänsch (born 1938), former President of the European Parliament
 Friedrich Hünermann (1886–1969), Catholic theologian and auxiliary bishop in Aachen
 Werner Koch (born 1961), German developer of Free Software and founder of the GNU Privacy Guard (GnuPG or GPG), lives in Hochdahl
 Manfred Lahnstein (born 1937) politician (SPD), former Federal Finance Minister and Member of the Management Board and Supervisory Board of Bertelsmann AG
 Flemming Lund (born 1952), Danish footballer for Fortuna Düsseldorf and Rot-Weiss Essen, lived in Hochdahl

 Joachim Neander (c. 1650–1680) German pastor, church poet and composer, first author about the Neandertal
 Aleksandar Ristić (born 1944), footballer and coach (among others Fortuna Düsseldorf), lived in Erkrath at this time
 Karl Sudhoff (1853–1938), founder of the medical history as a scientific discipline in Germany, was from 1885 to 1905 doctor of the Hochdahl iron foundry and Armenian physician, later also councilor of Hochdahl-Millrath
 Toni Turek (1919–1984), national goalkeeper and world champion of Bern 1954, lived during his years with Fortuna Düsseldorf and his world title in Erkrath. 50 years after Bern the Erkrath Stadium was named after him (Toni Turek Stadium)
 Karl Wenders (1841–1905), mayor of Neuss, Member of Reichstag and member of Landtag

References

External links

  
 Homepage of the Neanderthal Museum 
 Homepage of the Lokschuppen Museum 

Towns in North Rhine-Westphalia
Mettmann (district)